The K2K experiment (KEK to Kamioka) was a neutrino experiment that ran from June 1999 to November 2004. It used muon neutrinos from a well-controlled and well-understood beam to verify the oscillations previously observed by Super-Kamiokande using atmospheric neutrinos. This was the first positive measurement of neutrino oscillations in which both the source and detector were fully under experimenters' control. Previous experiments relied on neutrinos from the Sun or from cosmic sources. The experiment found oscillation parameters which were consistent with those measured by Super-Kamiokande.

Experimental design

K2K is a neutrino experiment which directed a beam of muon neutrinos from the  proton synchrotron at the KEK, located in Tsukuba, Ibaraki, to the Kamioka Observatory, located in Kamioka, Gifu, about 250 km away. The muon neutrinos travelled through Earth, which allowed them to oscillate (change) into other flavours of neutrinos, namely into electron neutrinos and tau neutrinos. K2K however, focused only on  oscillations.

The proton beam from the synchrotron was directed onto an aluminium target, and the resulting collisions produced a copious amount of pions. These pions were then focused into a 200 m decay pipe, where they would decay into muons and muon neutrinos. The muons were stopped at the end of the pipe, leaving a beam of muon neutrinos. The exact composition of the beam contained over 97% muon neutrinos, with the other 3% being made of electron neutrinos, electron antineutrinos and muon antineutrinos.

After they exited the pipe, the neutrinos went through a 1-kiloton water Cherenkov neutrino detector ("near detector") located at about 300 m from the aluminium target to determine the neutrino beam characteristics. This 1-kiloton "near detector" was a scaled-down version of the 50-kiloton Super-Kamiokande "far detector" located at the Kamioka Observatory, which allowed scientists to eliminate certain systematic uncertainties that would be present if two different detector types were used. This dual-detector configuration allowed the comparison of the neutrino beam at the near detector with the neutrino beam at the far detector to determine if neutrinos had oscillated or not.

Collaboration
The K2K collaboration consisted of roughly 130 physicists from 27 universities and research institutes from all over the world, listed below. The full list of scientists and their countries of origin is available on the K2K website.

Boston University
Chonnam National University
CEA Saclay (DSM-DAPNIA)
Dongshin University
High Energy Accelerator Research Organization
Hiroshima University
Institute for Cosmic Ray Research
Institute for Nuclear Research
Kobe University
Korea University
Kyoto University
Massachusetts Institute of Technology
Niigata University
Okayama University
Sapienza University of Rome
Seoul National University
State University of New York at Stony Brook
Tokyo University of Science
Tohoku University
Autonomous University of Barcelona/IFAE
University of California, Irvine
University of Geneva
University of Hawaii
University of Tokyo
University of Valencia
University of Warsaw
University of Washington

Results

The final K2K results found that at 99.9985% confidence (4.3 σ) there had been a disappearance of muon neutrinos. Fitting the data under the oscillation hypothesis, the best fit for the square of the mass difference between muon neutrinos and tau neutrinos was Δm2 = . This result is in good agreement with the previous Super-Kamiokande result, and the later MINOS result.

See also
T2K experiment – the successor of the K2K experiment

References

External links
K2K official website
K2K publications

Neutrino experiments